The Other Side of the Mountain is a 1975 American drama romance film based on the true story of ski racing champion Jill Kinmont. The UK title of the film was A Window to the Sky.

In early 1955, Kinmont was the national champion in slalom, and was a top U.S. prospect for a medal in the 1956 Winter Olympics, a year away. She was paralyzed in a near-fatal downhill accident at the Snow Cup in Alta, Utah, weeks before her 19th birthday, leaving her quadriplegic. Jill Kinmont Boothe died in Carson City, Nevada, on Feb. 9, 2012.

The film was directed by Larry Peerce, written by David Seltzer (based on the 1966 biography A Long Way Up by E. G. Valens), and stars Marilyn Hassett and Beau Bridges. It features the Oscar-nominated theme song "Richard's Window" (composed by Charles Fox, lyrics by Norman Gimbel), sung by Olivia Newton-John.

A sequel, The Other Side of the Mountain Part 2, was made in 1978.

Cast
Marilyn Hassett - Jill Kinmont
Beau Bridges - Dick "Mad Dog" Buek
Belinda J. Montgomery - Audra Jo Nicholson
Nan Martin - June Kinmont
Bill Vint - Buddy Werner
Dabney Coleman - Dave McCoy
William Bryant - Bill Kinmont
Hampton Fancher - Lee Zadroga
William Roerick - Dr. Pittman
Dori Brenner - Cookie
Walter Brooke - Dean
Jocelyn Jones - Linda Meyers
Greg Mabrey - Bob Kinmont
Tony Becker - Jerry Kinmont as a boy
Griffin Dunne - Herbie Johnson

Release
The Other Side of the Mountain was one of the most successful box office releases for Universal Pictures in years and was said to have helped the company survive a difficult period.

Reception
The film earned North American theatrical rentals of $8.2 million.

Vincent Canby of The New York Times said: "The life came first, but the movie seems to have less interest in Miss Kinmont than in the devices of romantic fiction that reduce particularity of feeling to a sure-fire formula designed to elicit sentimental purposes. If you go to see 'The Other Side of the Mountain,' load up your handkerchiefs and leave your wits at home." Gene Siskel of the Chicago Tribune gave the film two-and-a-half stars out of four and wrote, "If a real person weren't involved, I'd feel more at ease saying this film is excessive in its grab for sympathy and admiration ... Bridges' natural charm brightens not only Kinmont's spirit but also the spirit of a movie that dangerously leans toward the maudlin." Variety wrote, "Film is a standout in every department, perfect casting, fine acting, sensitive photography and general overall production all combining to give unusual strength to subject matter." Kevin Thomas of the Los Angeles Times called it "a surefire formula tearjerker" whose most serious flaw was "the film's emphasis on the ordeal of Miss Kinmont's rehabilitation, which after all is a familiar enough but oh so heart-tugging process, at the expense of detailing her very struggle to do something useful with her life once she has learned to accept she will never again walk." Gary Arnold of The Washington Post wrote that the film "stands a good chance of becoming the next legitimate sleeper. In certain respects it's a superficial, banal piece of filmmaking, but the story it tries to tell has stirring and inspirational qualities, which cannot be found in any other American films at the moment." Tom Milne of The Monthly Film Bulletin wrote, "Though the facts may be facts, everything else is crocodile tears and spurious uplift, from the coy prologue in which the heroine tells her story to a winsome pack of children asking why she never got married, to the bitter-sweet ending (complete with drooling pop song) which would have given even a Victorian chambermaid qualms with its breathless heaping of darkest hours before the dawn."

Awards and nominations

See also
 List of American films of 1975

References

External links
 
 
 
 http://skiinghistory.org/lives/jill-kinmont-boothe

1975 films
1970s biographical drama films
American biographical drama films
American skiing films
Biographical films about sportspeople
Cultural depictions of American women
Cultural depictions of skiers
Filmways films
Films about paraplegics or quadriplegics
Films based on biographies
Films directed by Larry Peerce
Films produced by Edward S. Feldman
Films scored by Charles Fox
Films set in the 1950s
Universal Pictures films
1970s English-language films
1970s American films
Films about disability